Nightingale Valley is a 5.4 hectare geological Site of Special Scientific Interest near the town of Portishead, North Somerset, notified in 1989.

This site in the Vale of Gordano is listed because of Pleistocene ‘plateau-deposits’ which include ‘cannon-shot’ gravels, fine sandy gravels and silty gravels with a wide range of erratic lithologies.

References

Sites of Special Scientific Interest in Avon
Sites of Special Scientific Interest notified in 1989